Huang I-chien (born July 10, 1957) is a Taiwanese sport shooter. He competed at the 1996 Summer Olympics in the men's trap event, in which he tied for 57th place, and the men's double trap event, in which he placed sixth.

References

1957 births
Living people
Trap and double trap shooters
Taiwanese male sport shooters
Shooters at the 1996 Summer Olympics
Olympic shooters of Taiwan
20th-century Taiwanese people